Trustpilot Group plc, is a Danish consumer business operating a review website founded in Denmark in 2007 which hosts reviews of businesses worldwide. Nearly 1 million new reviews are posted each month. The site offers freemium services to businesses. It is listed on the London Stock Exchange, but has been criticised for the publication of fake reviews, and allowing companies to remove negative reviews.

History
Trustpilot was founded by the company’s current CEO, Peter Holten Mühlmann, in Denmark in 2007. He started the company when his parents started shopping online. At the time, he was studying at Aarhus University, School of Business and Social Sciences and would later leave university to pursue Trustpilot.

After raising $3 million in early venture funding from 2008 to 2010, Trustpilot received an initial capital injection from SEED Capital Denmark and Northzone in November 2011. One year later, Index Ventures, SEED Capital Denmark and Northzone invested $13 million in Series B funding in Trustpilot, which the company used for international growth.

In 2013, Trustpilot opened offices in New York and London. In the same year, the company was named Danish Startup of the Year at Next Web’s European Startup Awards. In 2014, Draper Esprit (formerly known as DFJ Esprit) invested $25 million in Trustpilot, along with support from the existing investors. According to VentureBeat, the Series C funding round would help Trustpilot “bring its online retail reviews service to the U.S.” At the end of 2014, Trustpilot employed 325 people and 400,000 new reviews were posted each month. According to Website Magazine, “Trustpilot soared in 2014,” and experienced “record growth with an 80 percent year-over-year increase in revenue.

In May 2015, Trustpilot received $73.5 million in Series D funding. The investment was led by Vitruvian Partners, with contributions from all existing investors. In March, 2015, Google announced it was launching product ratings in Germany, the UK and France. In order to do this, “Google is aggregating data in Europe from different sources” including third party aggregators like Trustpilot.

In February 2021, a private individual, Philip Waymouth, was ordered to pay £25,000 in libel damages after posting a negative review on TrustPilot's website. He had said in the post that Summerfield Browne of London was "another scam solicitor". The court found that Waymouth had not filed a complaint with the firm before posting. He said that he suggested that if Summerfield Browne refunded their fee, he would delete the post, but he said they did not respond.

In March 2021, Trustpilot listed on the London Stock Exchange. The founders stated that London’s stock market looked more attractive after a government-backed review called for an overhaul of the U.K. listings regime.

Products and activities
Anyone can post a review on Trustpilot. User account creation requires an email address or Facebook account. The company lets businesses collect and respond to reviews for free and offers specialized marketing and analytics features in their paid plans. It generates income from subscribing companies who use its software to be reviewed by customers and gain business acumen from reviews. Trustpilot has a licensing agreement with Google, allowing Trustpilot reviews to be listed as Google Seller Ratings, or “Google Stars.” It employs about 700 people and roughly  new reviews are posted each month. It has published 50 million reviews about more than  brands

Business model
Trustpilot operates a freemium business model and earns most of its revenue from companies that subscribe to its services.

Criticism
There are independent investigations that suggest that review websites such as Trustpilot may have fake reviews. There is controversy about the legitimacy of some of Trustpilot's and other consumer review websites' reviews and the way that it deals with complaints about them, although Trustpilot claims that it strives to only include genuine reviews. Trustpilot allows businesses to pay them to access its marketing services and use Trustpilot technology to filter reviews—normally selecting only favourable posts—that customers place on their own Web site or other places. This may violate certain laws or regulations. Trustpilot published fake reviews for Bizzyloans; it deleted them after they were brought to light by KwikChex, an online investigations company. Fake reviewers often steal the identities of real people to falsely build up reviewed companies' reputations. Trustpilot denies that it permits any known fraudulent reviews on its site.

On 14 September 2017, Trustpilot issued an open letter clarifying its review policy following allegations concerning the 'validity of reviews of [online estate agent] Purplebricks by customers'.

On 22 March 2019, The Times reported that estate agents Purplebricks and Foxtons are "gaming" Trustpilot feedback by paying it to help gain better scores. In August 2016 five reviews of Foxtons were published on Trustpilot, with an average score of 2.2 stars out of five. The following month there were 467 reviews, 90% of them awarding five stars.

On 6 February 2020 industry publication Property Industry Eye reported that Trustpilot was looking into reviews of estate agents ‘at large’ after claims from property review website allAgents that 70% of their reviews could be fake.

In May 2020, an episode of Joe Lycett's Got Your Back ran an experiment in which a fake company was created on Trustpilot, demonstrating the various ways of manipulating reviews on the site. Trustpilot published an online response, noting the value of the show's experiment in highlighting fraud on the site, and promising to implement changes to tackle the problem better.

Reporting reviews
Trustpilot reserves the right to remove reviews without any notice according to their policy. It insists that it always makes a bona fide effort to obey the law and its published policies to ensure that only authentic reviews remain on the website.

Companies are allowed to respond publicly to reviews, or report a review as invalid if they believe it violates Trustpilot's user guidelines or they have no record of the reviewer as a customer. When a company reports a review, it is automatically replaced with a message indicating that it is being assessed. If the reviewer does not provide the requested information to Trustpilot (e.g. proof of purchase) within seven days, Trustpilot removes the review.

Trustpilot may take "some time" to investigate a reported review, so even if after investigation the review is reinstated, if more reviews have been submitted to the company's satisfaction in the meantime, the reinstated review will be substantially less prominent than when it was first posted.

Proof of purchase is not required to post a new review. There is little incentive for a company to report positive reviews, even if not from customers, as invalid; companies will tend to report only unfavourable invalid reviews, which is likely to skew reviews in favour of the company.

Hiding negative reviews

Facebook plugin
Users of Trustpilot's Facebook plugin (for their Pro subscribers, paying $599 per month) have the option to display only reviews giving a certain score: "Choose the number of reviews that you want to display from the drop-down menu, then select the rating that the displayed reviews will have".

Trustbox feature
Paying Trustpilot subscribers using the "Trustbox" feature (which allows a website to show embedded Trustpilot reviews) can ensure only reviews with a minimum star rating will be displayed: there is a setting that "Displays the star ratings that you select, for example, all 3-, 4-, and 5-star reviews".

Trustpilot concedes "[by using Trustboxes] you don't show consumers the full, accurate picture of all your customers' opinions".

Trustpilot's own Plans & Pricing page shows the Trustbox in action, displaying reviews of their own platform, configured to display 4- and 5-star reviews only, beneath the slogan "Trustpilot is a universal symbol of trust".

In 2020, according to Trustpilot's first transparency report, it harboured more than 2 million fake reviews on its platform, all of which ultimately had to be removed.

References

External links
 

Review websites
Software companies of Denmark
Software companies based in Copenhagen
Danish companies established in 2007
Internet properties established in 2007
Danish websites
Companies listed on the London Stock Exchange
2021 initial public offerings
Companies based in Copenhagen Municipality